Muthoni Gachanja Likimani (born 1926) is a Kenyan activist and writer, who has published works of both fiction and non-fiction, as well as children's books. In her career she has also been a broadcaster, actress, teacher and publisher. She was the first Kenyan beauty queen, the first African to establish a public relations firm in Kenya and one of the country's earliest female authors.

Biography
Muthoni Likimani was born and raised in Kahuhia Mission, Murang'a District, Kenya, the daughter of Mariuma Wanjiura and Rev. Levi GochanJa. Her father was one of the first Kenyan Anglican church ministers. She taught at Kahuhia Teachers’ Training College, before undertaking further studies in Britain and Israel, becoming involved  in broadcasting and public relations. She went on to become one of the first women producers at the Kenya Broadcasting Corporation, working on women's and children's programmes, and was a freelance broadcaster for the BBC. She founded Noni's Publicity, a public relations company that also undertook publishing, such as producing the periodical Women of Kenya.

Her first novel, They Shall Be Chastised, was published in 1974, followed by What Does a Man Want? in the same year. In 1985 her third and most important book appeared, Passbook Number F. 47927: Women and Mau Mau in Kenya, its title a reference to her identity number during the Mau Mau struggle. It is a fictional work that dramatizes the roles women played and the strategies they adopted in their daily lives during the fight for freedom.

In the 1980s, Likimani became a Nairobi city councillor, which position she held until the government replaced the council with a city commission. Her autobiography, Fighting Without Ceasing, was published in 2005.

In 2007, she received the World YWCA Council Award in recognition of dedicated leadership for her involvement as a Women's Rights Activist. In 2014 she was appointed Peace Ambassador in Kenya of The International Forum for the Literature and Culture of Peace (IFLAC).

Personal life
A Kikuyu, she married the Masai Dr Jason Clement Likimani, whom she met when he was the Medical Officer of Health at Fort Hall (now Murang'a) District General Hospital. She has said: "He had been with my brother, Ngumba, at Makerere University College and he used to come home. He was the only African medical practitioner allowed access to detention camps to treat detainees. And during our visits I was not allowed inside the camps. I would converse across the barbed wire and would sneak in and out letters to detainees’ relatives. That is how I became an unofficial letter carrier even though my husband did not know." They had four children. Her husband died in 1989.

Selected works
 They Shall Be Chastised. Nairobi: East African Literature Bureau, 1974. Kenya Literature Bureau, 1991, .
 What Does a Man Want? Nairobi: Kenya Literature Bureau, 1974. Noni's Publicity, 2001, 
 Passbook Number F. 47927: Women and Mau Mau in Kenya. Basingstoke and London: Palgrave Macmillan, 1985, . Noni's Publicity, 2001, .
 Women of Kenya: In the Decade of Development. Nairobi: Noni's Publicity, 1985.
 Fighting Without Ceasing, Nairobi: Noni's Publicity, 2005, .

References

External links
 "Muthoni Likimani: Story of a Legend", Africa Creates, 25 July 2013.
 "Capital Talk Muthoni Likimani", K24TV interview Part 1; "Capital Talk Muthoni Likimani Part 2", "Capital Talk Muthoni Likimani Part 3", "Capital Talk Muthoni Likimani Part 4", YouTube.

1926 births
Living people
Kenyan children's writers
Kenyan women children's writers
Kenyan activists
Kenyan women activists
20th-century Kenyan women writers
20th-century Kenyan writers
21st-century Kenyan women writers